Hedysareae is a tribe of plants in the subfamily Faboideae. Hedysareae species have loments, a type of modified legume that breaks apart at constrictions occurring between the segments of the seeds.

Genera
The tribe consists of the following genera:

Caraganean Clade
 Calophaca Fisch. ex DC.
 Caragana Fabr.
 Halimodendron Fisch. ex DC.

Chesneyean Clade
 Chesneya Lindl. ex Endl.
 Gueldenstaedtia Fisch.
 Spongiocarpella Yakovlev & N. Ulziykh.
 Tibetia (Ali) H. P. Tsui

Hedysaroid Clade
 Alhagi Gagnebin
 Corethrodendron Fisch. ex Bashiner
 Ebenus L.
 Eversmannia Bunge
 Greuteria Amirahmadi & Kaz. Osaloo.
 Hedysarum L.
 Onobrychis Mill.
 Sartoria Boiss. & Heldr.
 Sulla Medik.
 Taverniera DC.

Systematics
Molecular phylogenetics have uncovered the following relationships:

References

 
Fabaceae tribes